Nathan Ballentine (born December 10, 1970) is a Republican member of the South Carolina House of Representatives, United States, representing the House District 71 since 2005.

Early years and family
Nathan was born in Richland County and has two children. He works for Movement Mortgage in Columbia, South Carolina.

South Carolina House of Representatives

On June 8, 2004, Ballentine defeated the 16-year incumbent, Rick Quinn, who served as the House Majority Leader.

Ballentine was elected Vice Chairman of the Medical, Military, Public and Municipal Affairs committee during his freshman year (2005). He focussed on healthcare in his first two years. Following re-election (2007–2008) he worked on fiscal issues.

During 2009 and 2010, Ballentine was the chief cosponsor, with then-Representative Nikki Haley, pushing for more accountability with On-The-Record Voting. That bill ultimately died in the Senate; but not before the House made a rule change and passed the bill with no dissenting votes. In 2011 Ballentine became lead sponsor for the On-The-Record Voting Bill.

In the 2010 session, Balllentine's Campaign Finance Disclosure Bill became law. The bill requires every elected official (from school board, to county office holders, etc.) to file their campaign disclosure report on-line.

During his career in the South Carolina General Assembly, Ballentine has served on the Education and Public Works Committee, the House Ethics Committee, the Joint Transportation Review Screening Committee, and has been named a Friend of the Taxpayer and Taxpayer Hero every year he has served in Columbia.

Ballentine is the Chairman of the Regulations Subcommittee in the House Agriculture, Natural Resources and Environmental Affairs Committee.

Ballentine does not keep his State House salary, donating it to community groups and organizations.

References

External links
Nathan Ballentine Official website
South Carolina Legislature - Representative Nathan Ballentine (R) 71st District Official SC House website
Project Vote Smart - Representative Nathan Ballentine (SC) profile
Follow the Money - Nathan Ballentine
2006 2004 campaign contributions

1970 births
Living people
Republican Party members of the South Carolina House of Representatives
21st-century American politicians